Renée-Élisabeth Marlié (1714 – 27 March 1773, Paris) was an 18th-century French engraver.

Biography 
The daughter of a master writer, Marlié married François-Bernard Lépicié in 1732, an engraver who taught her his art and, according to Pierre-Jean Mariette, used her skill in several of his own works. Besides these works previously mentioned, the following engravings are also signed simply Lépicié:

Caffé charmant ta liqueur agréable
De Bacchus calme les accès
Ton feu divin dissipe de la table 
Et les dégoûts et les excès.

Le Cuisinier Flamand

She died in the dwelling occupied by her husband in the Louvre, which had been left to her. Her son, the painter Nicolas Bernard Lépicié designed boards for the continuation of l’Histoire de France, which was finished by Jean-Michel Moreau.

Sources 
 Abecedario de P.-J. Mariette, et autres notes inédites de cet amateur sur les arts et les artistes, work published by MM. Ph. de Chennevières and A. de Montaiglon, Paris, J.-B. Dumoulin, 1851/53-1859/60.
 Roger Portalis and Henri Beraldi, Les Graveurs du dix-huitième siècle, vol. I, Paris, Morgand et Fatout, 1880–82,  (p. 662), .
 Michael Bryan and G.C. Williamson, Bryan’s dictionary of painters and engravers, vol.3, Londob, G. Bell and sons, 1904,  (p. 212).

External links 
 Renée-Élisabeth Marlié in Joconde
 Le Goût by Renée-Élisabeth Lépicié 
 Renée-Élisabeth Marlié on data.bnf.fr

18th-century French engravers
1714 births
1773 deaths